The African American and African Diaspora Studies Program (AADS) at the University of North Carolina at Greensboro (UNCG) was established in 1981 as a “student designed” minor in Black Studies. Located in Greensboro, North Carolina, the AADS program at UNCG shares a rich history with the city of Greensboro a location in the Underground Railroad, a hotbed for Civil Rights activism, and home of the Greensboro sit-ins that originated in downtown Greensboro.

The AADS program is committed to enabling all of its students to engage in meaningful learning activities that provide them with an integrated and critical understanding of the experiences and contributions of peoples of African descent throughout the Americas. The program offers students the opportunity to examine experiences of Africans and African descendants by using theories and methods stemming from African American Studies and other fields. The interdisciplinary nature of the program allows its students to employ and combine the methods of traditional disciplines (e.g. literature, history, music, the visual arts, art history, religion, economics, philosophy, gender studies, political science, and sociology) in analyzing problems, issues, and questions that lie at the center of social, cultural, and political thought and action.  This approach not only requires students to understand the interconnectedness of artistic and social phenomena but also the need for interdisciplinary study in order to comprehend them. In effect, AADS students are able to apply these theories and methodologies to better understand the social, political, and economic problems facing African Americans and peoples of African descent throughout the world.

The program currently offers a bachelor's degree, and a post-baccalaureate certificate (PBC). Each year the program hosts its annual Conference on African American and African Diasporic Culture and Experiences (CACE) which offers the community and university an opportunity to examine the critical and timely issues that persons of African descent face globally, nationally, and locally.

History 
Between 1981-82, due to concerns expressed by a number of student groups on campus as well as the faculty-led Black Studies Committee (BSC), changes were requested from the university administration to address race relations on campus and the representation of minority students and faculty. It was argued that the present administration and social programming agencies on campus were not sensitive to the academic and social needs of minorities, specifically Black students. The Black Student Alliance (BSA) noted that the Student Government Association failed to address and represent the concerns of Black students, citing their overlook of racial tensions on campus. Therefore, the BSA felt it was the responsibility of the administration, the Student Development Advisory Board, the Media Board and Black Student Alliance to collectively become the catalyst for better racial relations at UNCG. In an effort to usher in the era of change, the BSA requested the following changes from the administration: to develop a new process for hiring Black faculty, to adjust the percentage of Black faculty on campus to be proportionate to the percentage of Black students, to develop more courses that pertain to minorities in all areas of study, to revise the current curriculum to reflect the achievements and to accomplishments of Blacks in all academic disciplines, and to use more sensitivity in administrative practices concerning minorities.

In December 1982, a formal petition was filed and signed by faculty and students urging the administration at UNCG to support and implement a Black Studies Program and to integrate Black Studies into existing courses.  Students renewed interest in previous demands made in 1982 by the coalition of Black campus organizations after a white student called a Black student dorm employee by a racial slur. As a result, Black students urged the administration to support the establishment of a Black Studies Program. They argued that additional Black faculty would unify Black and white students. They also argued that courses with a Black or an African emphasis would help to broaden white students’ understanding of Blacks and that more Black faculty would give the school’s 1,292 Black students (10.1 percent) needed role models. Before the new hiring, in 1983, only 15 or 2.39 percent of UNCG’s 628 full and part-time faculty were black.

Yet despite the implementation of a “student designed” minor, there was no formal Black Studies Program created. Instead, UNCG administrators and faculty decided that courses related to Black Studies would become part of a flexible interdepartmental program. The 1983-84 course catalog featured 11 classes that students could use for a designed minor in Black Studies. However, the minor would have to be approved by the Ad Hoc Committee on Black Studies (BCS).  It was reported by the Black Studies Committee, that owing to a lack of consensus toward the design of the minor, inadequate staff resources, and too few relevant courses available, the University did not approve an official Black Studies Program specifically designed courses.  The BSC decided that in order to become recognized on campus they needed to spread awareness to current and entering students about designing a minor and to evaluate and develop new course offerings. The aim was to create a solid foundation of course offerings to become an established program, develop a strong case for additional Black faculty, and to promote a better understanding of what Black Studies really constitutes.  In 1983, Dr. Lee Bernick, Chair of the BSC, put forth the first proposal to formalize the Black Studies minor. They proposed the creation of one or two courses on Black Studies, a re-evaluation of current and new course offerings, an independent research project in Black Studies, and the use of courses offered at the other four Greensboro colleges/universities to supplement the program’s listings.  However, it wasn’t until 1986 that the first Black Studies specific courses were offered to be used towards a minor in Black Studies: BKS 100 – Blacks in America, and BKS 110 – Blacks in American Society: Social Economic, and Political Perspectives.

In the following years, it was still a concern of the BSC and Committee on Minority Affairs that the low level of racial diversity on campus was associated with the need to recruit and retain Black faculty and the need to see that more Black students were enrolled in and graduated from the university. These issues, it was felt by both committees, could be addressed through the curriculum, at least in part. Therefore, the Black Studies Program at UNCG was viewed as one approach (among others) to cultivate multiculturalism and understanding.

Originally proposed by program Chair, Dr. Willie Barber, in the early 1990s members of the BSC debated the possibility of a name change, from “Black Studies” to “African American Studies.” It was agreed upon by the committee that the decision would be left up to the students themselves.  Later in the year, after feedback from students the proposition was voted on and passed to adopt “African American Studies” as the new program title. This change would officially take place in late 1992.

It was decided that “African American” more accurately expressed the cultural heritage of the people it represents: the roots of Blacks throughout the world exist in African soil, but “African American” also connotes an international context that is more consistent with the multi-cultural awareness and contemporary educational demands. The curriculum itself reflects this cultural diversity: courses range from treatments of African Caribbeans to Black Americans and aim to incorporate the many areas of the African American experience.

Dr. Angela Rhone assumed the Chair position in 1991-92. Under her leadership, the program focused on ways to establish a well-defined program for the minor degree. In order to generate more interest and support for the program the BSC advertised to students and spread awareness on campus. In 1991, a minor in Black Studies (BKS) was approved and several students selected BKS as their minor. Additionally that year, two part-time faculty were hired to teach courses in Black Studies/African American Studies. The students also began to contribute to the Carolina Peacemaker, Greensboro’s Black newspaper and it was used as a teaching tool in all BKS/AFS classes. A number of special events were implemented that engaged students and the community. “African Americans and the 1992 Election” featured a variety of guest speakers, as well as the AFS Program Film and Lecture series that featured a number of prominent African American historical figures, and addressed key issues such as racism in America and how Blacks are portrayed in the media.

In 1992, BKS/AFS courses (100,110, and 200) were approved to fulfill All-University Liberal Education Requirements (AULER), which was designed to promote a broad, liberal education for all students at the university. The first objective of the African American Studies curriculum was to “signify to the university community that teaching and learning about the history and experiences of Blacks in American society is an integral part of a university education.”

Enrollment in AFS courses steadily increased in the intervening years (1992–1995) and that trend has continued. Meanwhile, the Program still continued to fight for the hiring of tenured faculty. Dr. Frank Woods (1994–2008) assumed the Chair/Director position in 1994. Dr. Woods’ impressive tenure as program Chair/Director has been the longest held of any in that position. Carrying the trend of past Chairs, Dr. Woods worked closely with several departments and units at UNCG to bring a number of notable scholars to campus for informative lectures related to the African American experience and the arts, especially during Black History Month and CACE conferences. The Program experienced exponential growth under the leadership of Dr. Woods, as course offerings and student enrollment continued to increase. Of course, these efforts did not go unnoticed by the university during their review of the Program.

The university review of the African American Studies Program was conducted in 1999. It was stated that the administration was “impressed by the institutional commitment and assiduous leadership of both faculty and staff.” Dr. Woods was also recognized for his efforts in stimulating the growth of the Program. Additionally, at this point in the program, there was overwhelming enthusiasm and support from students that garnered the attention of the university. The students expressed a desire to major in African American Studies already celebrated impressive enrollment and a substantial number of mirrors relative to other similarly situated interdisciplinary programs. The annual CACE conference, which was in its 10th year, “has taken the lead in exploring issues of diversity which embrace all students as it provides opportunities to discuss and analyze race, class, culture, and ethnicity.” It was expressed that due to the tremendous growth of the program and strong student enrollment, it was a goal of the program and the university to implement a bachelor's degree in African American Studies.  As a long-standing goal of the program, Dr. Woods was instrumental in the process as that goal was achieved and the African American Studies program began to offer a bachelor's degree in the field, beginning in 2002. Additionally, longtime lecturer, Michael Cauthen, assisted with the process of developing the degree program.

In 2008, the Program hired its first tenured faculty and Director, Dr. Tara T. Green (2008–2016). Building off a process that began when Dr. Woods was director, AFS was approved for a graduate post-baccalaureate certificate in African American Studies. The program is also available online to graduate students currently enrolled in a graduate degree program at UNCG. Within the certificate program, students study the historical and political origins and foundations of African American Studies. In 2009, Dr. Green was instrumental in the process of helping the university sign an agreement with the University of Botswana, for a study abroad trip for AADS students, and extended an agreement with the University of Ghana. Two AADS majors studied abroad in Botswana in Spring, 2009.

In 2012-2013 UNCG’s African American Studies program garnered national recognition as one of the top 10 programs of its kind in the country, according to Academic Analytics. During this year, as the Program celebrated its 30th anniversary, AFS graduated its largest class to date, with nearly 20 students earning more than $250,000 in grants and scholarships to continue their studies at universities such as Duke, Vanderbilt, Rutgers, and UC Berkeley. Also during this year, the Program established its first scholarship, made possible by the generosity of UNCG alumna Whitney “Whitty” Ransome, who served for almost two decades as co-executive director of the National Coalition of Girls’ Schools, and co-founded the coalition in 1991.

In 2014 the Program succeeded in amending the name of “African American Studies” to the “African American and African Diaspora Studies Program” (AADS). The name change marked the beginning of a new phase of critical inquiry. The extended name allows the Program to retain its identity, as it has been for over ten years, and to augment it by including studies of people and cultures of the African diaspora who do not identify as American or who are new to America. AADS was said to reflect the diverse course offerings in comparative African history and literature.

Program Director, Dr. Green implemented a number of forums, discussions, and lecture series that have featured notable scholars related in the field of African American, African, and Latin American Studies, including author and poet Brenda Marie Osbey and Dr. E Patrick Johnson as well as a host of students, faculty, and community members dedicated to social justice, education, and equality.

Conference on African American and African Diasporic Cultures and Experiences (CACE) 
CACE was initiated in 1990 by the UNCG Department of Religious Studies (originally known as the Conference on African-American Religion in American Culture) in conjunction with other academic units, interested staff, students, faculty, and members of the larger community. The conference seeks to promote a better understanding within the university and the Greensboro community of the various facets of African American culture and experience. To that end, each conference has sought to examine critical and timely African-American related issues and perspectives, and to engage both members of the Greensboro community and the university in the exploration and discussion of those issues and perspectives.

External links 
 African American and African Diaspora Studies Program at UNCG
 Conference on African American and African Diasporic Culture and Experiences
 Greensboro and the Underground Railroad

References 

University of North Carolina at Greensboro
Black studies organizations
1981 establishments in North Carolina